Disney Hotel New York — The Art of Marvel is a hotel situated in Disneyland Paris. Originally called Disney's Hotel New York, the original hotel was designed by the 2011 Driehaus Prize winner and postmodern architect Michael Graves. Citing early 20th century Art Deco it was designed to echo the essence and feel of New York City. The exterior of the hotel itself is a stylised skyscraper-filled skyline. The hotel opened in 1992.

During the 2017 edition of D23, Bob Chapek, chairman of Disney Parks, Experiences and Products, announced that the hotel would be reimagined by Walt Disney Imagineering to Disney's Hotel New York – The Art of Marvel. The reimagined hotel eventually opened in June 2021. A subsequent rebrand that saw the possessive apostrophe dropped took place in July 2022. This meant the name became Disney Hotel New York — The Art of Marvel.

Retheming into The Art of Marvel 
The retheming of the hotel will make you feel as if you're in the middle of New York, reminiscing of a luxury and contemporary Manhattan hotel. The interior design will be sleek and cosmopolitan in the style of Tony Stark and the Avengers Headquarters and will showcase the “Art of Marvel” in a way that reinvents the idea of an art hotel. Bold art pieces on display will showcase the diverse art from the Marvel universe, from comic art, film, design, sculpture to the costume of our favourite superheroes. Pieces will include comic book covers, posters, concept art from films, storyboards, production design, props, original sketches, media, and more.

The hotel features 471 standard rooms, 14 accessible rooms, 65 executive rooms, and 25 suites. The rooms’ interiors will reflect the urban sophistication of Tony Stark's tastes, with a colour palette that calls back to his Iron Man suit. The hotel's one-of-a-kind suites will be themed around Marvel Super Heroes and New York City. For these suites, a Marvel artist will be commissioned to create pieces for the rooms featuring the heroes.

During the D23 expo of August 2019, it was announced that one of the suites of the hotel would be fully themed into Spider-Man, while the more standard rooms are more Iron-Man inspired.

Activities and Dining
The hotel features two restaurants, the Manhattan Restaurant originally based on Manhattan's Cotton Club; now features many elements of the MCU including an Asgardian chandelier. Also, the Downtown Restaurant is an art-deco style restaurant with marvel comics adorning its walls. Outside features Bryant Park; an event space based on the park of the same name in Manhattan.

Super Hero Station is an infant play area inspired by Marvel characters. An indoor/outdoor pool with a jacuzzi and pool toys is available. The Empire State Club once held Character breakfasts. A Disney character used to appear every morning next to the hotel lobby.

Location
Disney Hotel New York — The Art of Marvel is the nearest to Panoramagique and Disney Village.

References

New York
Michael Graves buildings
Hotels established in 1992
Hotel buildings completed in 1992